Carex atrofusca, the dark brown sedge or scorched alpine sedge, is a species of sedge with a circumpolar or circumboreal distribution in the northern hemisphere.

Describtion 
Carex atrofusca is a perennial cespitose loosely tufted sedge approximately 6–30 cm high. Sheaths present and persisting, brown - yellowish brown. Leaves are 3–4 mm in with approximately half as long as flowering stems. It is monoecious, with 2-4 spikes, top most one male and 1-3 female spikes nodding.

References 

atrofusca
Flora of Europe
Flora of North America
Plants described in 1801
Flora of Greenland